The "Last Post" is either an A or a B♭ bugle call, primarily within British infantry and Australian infantry regiments, or a D or an E♭ cavalry trumpet call in British cavalry and Royal Regiment of Artillery (Royal Horse Artillery and Royal Artillery), and is used at Commonwealth military funerals, and ceremonies commemorating those who have died in war.

Its duration varies typically from a little over one minute to nearly three minutes. For ceremonial use, the "Last Post" is often followed by "The Rouse", or less frequently the longer "Reveille".

The two regimental traditions have separate music for the call. While the B♭ infantry bugle version is better known, the E♭ cavalry trumpet version is used by the state trumpeters of the Household Cavalry.

Origin and wartime use

The "First Post" call signals the start of the duty officer's inspection of a British Army camp's sentry posts, sounding a call at each one. First published in the 1790s, the "Last Post" call originally signalled merely that the final sentry post had been inspected, and the camp was secure for the night. In addition to its normal garrison use, the "Last Post" call had another function at the close of a day of battle.  It signalled to those who were still out and wounded or separated that the fighting was done, and to follow the sound of the call to find safety and rest.

Its use in Remembrance Day ceremonies in Commonwealth nations has two generally unexpressed purposes: the first is an implied summoning of the spirits of the Fallen to the cenotaph, the second is to symbolically end the day, so that the period of silence before the "Rouse" is blown becomes in effect a ritualised night vigil. The "Last Post" as sounded at the end of inspection typically lasted for about 45 seconds; when sounded ceremonially with notes held for longer, pauses extended, and the expression mournful, typical duration could be 75 seconds or more.

This custom dates from the 17th century or earlier. It originated with British troops stationed in the Netherlands, where it drew on an older Dutch custom, called taptoe, from which comes the term tattoo as in Military tattoo. The taptoe was also used to signal the end of the day, but originated from a signal that beer taps had to be shut, hence that the day had ended. It comes from the Dutch phrase Doe den tap toe, meaning "Close the tap". The Dutch bugle call Taptoesignaal, now used for remembrance events, is not the same tune as the "Last Post".

The "Last Post" was used by British forces throughout North America in colonial times.  In the United States it was replaced by the different "Taps" by the United States Army, first used in 1862 and officially recognized in 1874.

Memorial usage

During the 19th century, the "Last Post" was also carried to the various countries of the British Empire. In all these countries, it has been incorporated into military funerals, where it is sounded as a final farewell, symbolising the fact that the duty of the dead soldier is over and that they can rest in peace.

"Last Post" is used in public ceremonials commemorating the war dead, particularly on Remembrance Day in the Commonwealth of Nations. In Australia and New Zealand it is also sounded on Anzac Day, usually before the two-minute silence, which concludes with "The Rouse".

When the post is sounded during services such as Anzac Day, it is required of all current serving military members to salute for the duration of the call. During services organised by the Royal British Legion, it is expected that no salute is given during the "Last Post" and Silence, as all personnel will have removed head dress as in church service prayer, have heads bowed, weapons inverted, and flags and standards lowered.

In the Republic of Ireland, the "Last Post" as with the Commonwealth is sounded during memorial services, funerals and commemorations. The difference where the Irish are concerned is that the accompaniment of drums is incorporated into the performance.

In India, Last Post is played at the Amar Jawan Jyoti on Republic Day and Kargil Vijay Diwas (Kargil Victory Day).

Menin Gate

Since 1928, the "Last Post" has been sounded every evening at 8 p.m. by buglers of the local Last Post Association at the war memorial at Ypres in Belgium known as the Menin Gate, commemorating the British Empire dead at the Battle of Ypres during the First World War. The only exception to this was during the four years of the German occupation of Ypres from 20 May 1940 to 6 September 1944, when the ceremony moved to Brookwood Military Cemetery in England.

On the evening that Polish forces liberated Ypres, the ceremony was resumed at the Menin Gate, in spite of the heavy fighting still going on in other parts of the town. These buglers or trumpeters, sometimes seen in fire brigade uniform, are members of the fire brigade representing the Last Post Association, who organizes the events. The Last Post Association uses both silver B♭ bugles and E♭ cavalry trumpets, with either British Army tradition being respected during services at the gate.

The Last Post ceremony has now been held more than 30,000 times. On 9 July 2015, a ceremony titled A tribute to the tribute took place to commemorate the 30,000th ceremony.

Other uses

The "Last Post" was incorporated into the finale of Robert Steadman's In Memoriam, a choral work on the subject of remembrance. It is also incorporated into Karl Jenkins's orchestral mass The Armed Man, and in the movement entitled Small Town, in Peter Sculthorpe's 1963 chamber orchestra work The Fifth Continent. A slightly altered version forms part of the slow movement of the Pastoral Symphony of Ralph Vaughan Williams and the ending of Mike Sammes' choral setting of Laurence Binyon's poem For the Fallen.

Robert Graves's poem "The Last Post" describes a soldier's funeral during World War I. Ford Madox Ford used The Last Post as title for part of his tetralogy Parade's End.

In 2015, Lee Kernaghan recorded a version for his album Spirit of the Anzacs.

The Last Post is the title of a theatre play by David Owen Smith and Peter Came performed during Armistice Week at Lincoln Drill Hall, Lincoln in November 2014.  The play concerns the Beechey family of Lincoln, UK.  Amy Beechey had eight sons who all enlisted to fight during the First World War; only three of them survived.  The bugle call is sounded during the final moments of the play.  The play was directed by Janie Smith and performed by people of Lincoln.

British Forces Broadcasting Service radio stations would play the "Last Post" before the National Anthem at closedown.

See also
"Danmarks sidste honnør", the Danish Defence equivalent
"Ich hatt' einen Kameraden" ('I had a comrade'), the German and Austrian equivalent for military funerals
"Il Silenzio" ('Silence'), the Italian equivalent
"La muerte no es el final" ('Death is not the end'), the Spanish Armed Forces equivalent
"Reveille", a bugle call sounded at sunrise
"sonnerie aux morts", the French Armed Forces equivalent
"Taps", the United States Armed Forces equivalent
"The Rouse"
Antoon Verschoot

References

External links

The Last Post Association website relating to the Menin Gate (a recording of "Last Post" can be heard at this website)
Sheet music for the "Last Post" (from an Australian site commemorating ANZAC Day)
Last Post website run by a trumpet player, with music, MIDI files and notes on performance and nomenclature.
"Last Post" played at a ANZAC Day service in New Zealand, Flash sound player, listen online

 Recording (WMA) of cavalry version of Last Post, Regimental Band of the Queen's Own Hussars

Bugle calls
Military music
Ceremonies
Funerary bugle calls
Military life